Manny Diaz may refer to:
Manny Diaz (American football) (born 1974), American college football coach and son of Manny Diaz (Florida politician)
Manny Diaz (California politician) (born 1953), former California State Assemblyman
Manny Diaz (Florida politician) (born 1954), former mayor of Miami
Manny Díaz Jr. (born 1973), Education Commissioner of Florida

See also
Manuel Díaz (disambiguation)